Shatt al Gharsah, Chott el Gharsa (Arabic language شط الغرسة) is sedimentary basin and also intermittent salt lake in Tunisia. It has width of 20 kilometres and length of 50 kilometres. At 17 metres under sea level it is at the lowest point of the country.

References 

Lakes of Tunisia
Saline lakes of Africa